The Sturgeon-class destroyers served with the Royal Navy from 1894; three were built by the Vickers yard and differed from other similar ships in having their mast stepped before the first funnel. They were armed with one twelve pounder and two torpedo tubes. They carried a complement of 53 officers and men.

Construction and design
On 8 November 1893, the British Admiralty placed an order with the Naval Construction and Armament Company of Barrow-in-Furness (later to become part of Vickers) for three "Twenty-Seven Knotter" destroyers as part of the 1893–1894 construction programme for the Royal Navy, with in total, 36 destroyers being ordered from various shipbuilders for this programme.

The Admiralty only laid down a series of broad requirements for the destroyers, leaving detailed design to the ships' builders.

Three funnels were fitted, with the foremast between the ship's bridge and the first funnel. The ship's crew was 53 officers and men.

All three ships had been sold for scrapping before 1913 when the Admiralty re-classed the surviving 27-knotter destroyers as A Class destroyers.

See also
A-class destroyer (1913)

Ships

References

Notes

Bibliography
 

 
 

Destroyer classes
Ship classes of the Royal Navy